WCBA may refer to:

 Warrington College of Business Administration
 West Coast Baseball Association, a league which lasted only two months in 1946
 Westchester County Bar Association, based in White Plains, New York
 Western Counties Baseball Association, part of Baseball Ontario in Canada
 Women's Chinese Basketball Association, the pre-eminent women's professional basketball league in China
 WCB-Alberta, the workers' compensation board in Alberta, Canada
 We Came Bearing Arms, a Belgian metalcore band

Among radio callsigns, WCBA may refer to:
 WCBA (AM), a defunct radio station (1350 AM) formerly licensed to serve South Corning, New York, United States
 WPHD (FM), a sister station on the 98.7 frequency, which formerly held the WCBA-FM call sign